Henri Albert Fernand Laurent (1 April 1881 in Beaulieu-sur-Loire – 14 February 1954 in La Rochelle) was a French fencer who competed in the early 20th century.

He participated in fencing at the 1900 Summer Olympics in Paris and won the bronze medal in the masters épée. He was defeated by fellow French fencer Emile Bougnol in the semi-final.

References

External links

French male épée fencers
Olympic bronze medalists for France
Olympic fencers of France
Fencers at the 1900 Summer Olympics
1881 births
1954 deaths
Olympic medalists in fencing
Medalists at the 1900 Summer Olympics
Sportspeople from Loiret
20th-century French people